This is a list of artworks by the British artist Helen Chadwick (1953-1996) grouped by decade.

1970-79 

 Menstrual Toilet/ Menstrual Piece - 1975-76
 Domestic Sanitation - 1976
 In The Kitchen - 1977
 Train of Thought - 1978-79

1980-89 

 Model Institution - 1981-83
 The Juggler's Table - 1983
 Ego Geometria Sum - 1982-83
 The Oval Court - 1984-86
 One Flesh - 1985
 Allegory of Misrule - 1986
 Ruin - 1986
 Ecce - 1987
 Lofos Nymphon  - 1987
 Three Houses: A Modern Moral Subject
 Viral Landscapes - 1989
 Philosopher's Fear of Flesh - 1989
 Enfleshing I & II - 1989
 Meat Abstract No.1-8  - 1989
 Black Hole - 1989
 Anatoli - 1989

1990-96 

 Nostalgie de la Boue - 1990
 Eroticism - 1990
 Loop My Loop  - 1991
 Piss Flowers - 1991-92
 Wreath to Pleasure No.1-12 - 1992-93
 I Thee Wed - 1993
 Birth of Barbie  - 1993
 Glossolalia - 1993
 Like a Virgin - 1994
 Billy Budd - 1994
 Adore; Abhor - 1994
 Cacao - 1994
 Philoxenia - 1994-95
 Et in Arcadia - 1995
 Cameo series - 1995-96
 Monstrance - 1996
 Nebula - 1996

References 
British art
Feminist art
English art